Sarah Bovy (born 15 May 1989 in Brussels) is a Belgian female racing driver.  She has last competed with the Iron Lynx team in the European Le Mans Series in 2021.

Biography
Following two years in karting, Bovy began her racing career as a Formula Renault Academy driver in Formula Renault 1.6 Belgium. Former Formula One driver Thierry Boutsen took her under his wing as part of his team, and began an association with the Boutsen-Ginion squad that saw her race in GT, touring car and silhouette racing disciplines before taking a years' break in 2014 due to a lack of funding and undertook a Bachelor of Marketing course.

Bovy returned to the sport in 2015, gaining the funding to complete a full season in the Renault Sport Trophy. She yielded a podium in her home race at Spa-Francorchamps before falling back into a part-time endurance campaign in 2016. The next two seasons would see her align with Lamborghini, contesting the 2017 Super Trofeo Europe Championship – finishing 14th in the Pro-Am class – and various endurance races in 2018, finishing second in class at the 2018 24 Hours of Spa.

In 2019, Bovy applied for entry into the women's only Formula 3 championship W Series. She was accepted as one of the series' reserve drivers, and would be called upon on three occasions – the first time in her home race at Zolder where she failed to start with technical issues; again in Misano following injury for regular driver Emma Kimiläinen, finishing 12th; and also in the final round of the championship at Brands Hatch, ending the race 19th after sustaining front-wing damage in the early laps. She scored no points and was the penultimate driver in the standings.

Racing record

Career summary

* Season still in progress.

Complete W Series results
(key) (Races in bold indicate pole position) (Races in italics indicate fastest lap)

Complete 24 Hours of Le Mans results

Complete European Le Mans Series results
(key) (Races in bold indicate pole position; results in italics indicate fastest lap)

Complete FIA World Endurance Championship results
(key) (Races in bold indicate pole position) (Races in italics indicate fastest lap)

References

External links
Profile at Driver Database
Official website

Belgian racing drivers
1989 births
Living people
W Series drivers
FIA GT Championship drivers
Blancpain Endurance Series drivers
24H Series drivers
24 Hours of Spa drivers
Asian Le Mans Series drivers
FIA World Endurance Championship drivers
24 Hours of Le Mans drivers
European Le Mans Series drivers
Belgian Formula Renault 1.6 drivers
21st-century Belgian women
Boutsen Ginion Racing drivers
Le Mans Cup drivers
Iron Lynx drivers
WeatherTech SportsCar Championship drivers
Belgian female racing drivers